Andy Geggan (born 8 May 1987) is a Scottish professional footballer who plays for Drumchapel United.

Geggan started his career with Livingston, and has also played with Dumbarton, Dunfermline Athletic, Partick Thistle, BSC Glasgow and had two spells at Ayr United.

Career
Geggan played for Livingston as a youth player before joining Dumbarton in 2006, where played there for five seasons making 164 appearances in all competitions scoring nine goals. He collected a winners medal with Dumbarton as they won the Scottish Third Division in 2009.

Ayr United
On 28 June 2011, Geggan joined Scottish First Division side Ayr United. Making his debut on 23 July 2011 in the Scottish Challenge Cup, Geggan scored in injury time to help the side to a 2–0 victory over Queen of the South. He made his league debut on 6 August 2011 against Hamilton Academical at Somerset Park.

Dunfermline Athletic
On 9 June 2012, Geggan signed for Dunfermline Athletic on a two-year deal, making his first appearance for his new side in the Scottish Challenge Cup loss to Forfar Athletic. His first goal for the club came in January 2013, in a match against local rivals Raith Rovers. In February 2014, shortly before his contract ended, Geggan signed a new two-and-a-half-year deal, keeping him at East End Park until the end of the 2015–16 season. For the latter half of the 2013–14 season, Geggan was also appointed club captain for Dunfermline, after previous captain Josh Falkingham had rejected a contract extension with the club.

Ayr United return
After five years away from Somerset Park, Geggan rejoined Ayr United on 25 May 2017, signing a two-year deal with the club. On his second debut for the team, Geggan scored the only goal of the game as Ayr beat their rivals Kilmarnock for the first time in 18 years. Geggan also stamped his name into footballing folklore, when he scored the Honest Mens record breaking 100th goal of the season in all competitions in the game v Airdrie on 24 February 2018, the leading goal scorers in UK football for the season.

BSC Glasgow 
Lowland League club BSC Glasgow announced the signing of Geggan on 19 August 2020 after he left Ayr United.

Partick Thistle loan 
Geggan joined Partick Thistle on loan on 8 March 2021, taking the squad number 88.

Dumbarton return 
After leaving BSC Glasgow, Geggan returned to his first senior club, Dumbarton, 10 seasons after leaving the club in June 2021. He scored on his first league appearance since returning, volleying in an 86th-minute equaliser against Airdrieonians. After 185 appearances across his two spells with the club, Geggan left Dumbarton in January 2022.

Drumchapel United
Geggan signed for Drumchapel United in 2022.

Career statistics

Honours

Club
Dumbarton
Scottish Third Division: 2008–09

Dunfermline Athletic
Scottish League One: 2015–16

Ayr United 
 Scottish League One: 2017–18

Partick Thistle
Scottish League One: 2020–21

References

External links

1987 births
Living people
Livingston F.C. players
Dumbarton F.C. players
Ayr United F.C. players
Scottish Football League players
Footballers from Glasgow
Scottish footballers
Association football midfielders
Dunfermline Athletic F.C. players
Scottish Professional Football League players
Broomhill F.C. (Scotland) players
Partick Thistle F.C. players
Drumchapel United F.C. players
West of Scotland Football League players